The canton of Mouy is an administrative division of the Oise department, northern France. Its borders were modified at the French canton reorganisation which came into effect in March 2015. Its seat is in Mouy.

It consists of the following communes:
 
Angy
Ansacq
Bailleul-sur-Thérain
Bonlier
Bresles
Bury
Cambronne-lès-Clermont
Le Fay-Saint-Quentin
Fontaine-Saint-Lucien
Fouquerolles
Guignecourt
Haudivillers
Heilles
Hermes
Hondainville
Juvignies
Lafraye
Laversines
Litz
Maisoncelle-Saint-Pierre
Mouy
Neuilly-sous-Clermont
La Neuville-en-Hez
Nivillers
Oroër
Rémérangles
Rochy-Condé
La Rue-Saint-Pierre
Saint-Félix
Therdonne
Thury-sous-Clermont
Tillé
Troissereux
Velennes
Verderel-lès-Sauqueuse

References

Cantons of Oise